P. Mohan Kandaswamy is an Indian politician and former Member of the Legislative Assembly of Tamil Nadu. He was elected to the Tamil Nadu legislative assembly as a Tamil Maanila Congress party candidate from Pongalur constituency in the 1996 election.

References 

Living people
Tamil Maanila Congress politicians
Tamil Nadu MLAs 1996–2001
Year of birth missing (living people)